The following is an episode list for the Adult Swim television series Tom Goes to the Mayor. Two pilots for Tom Goes to the Mayor were produced as web shorts and were featured at an independent film festival and released on timanderic.com. Neither pilots have aired on television. The series officially premiered on November 14, 2004 with "Bear Traps", and ended with "Joy's Ex" on September 25, 2006, with a total of 30 episodes over the course of two seasons. The entire series was released on DVD on April 3, 2007. In addition to being available on DVD, Tom Goes to the Mayor is also available on iTunes.

Series overview

Episodes

Pilots

Season 1 (2004–05)

Season 2 (2006)

Special (2005)

References

External links
 
 

Tom Goes to the Mayor
Tom Goes to the Mayor
Tim & Eric